The Mamberamo shrikethrush (Colluricincla obscura) is a species of bird in the family Pachycephalidae.

Taxonomy and systematics
This species was formerly considered a conspecific member of the little shrikethrush complex. Genetic investigations of New Guinea populations of the little shrikethrush indicate high levels of genetic divergence, suggesting it comprised more than one species.

Subspecies
Currently, two subspecies are recognized:
 C. o. obscura - (Meyer, AB, 1874): Originally described as a separate species in the genus Rectes. Found on Yapen (off northwestern New Guinea))
 C. o. hybridus - (Meise, 1929): Found on nw and wc New Guinea

Distribution and habitat
It is found in New Guinea. Its natural habitats are subtropical or tropical moist lowland forests and subtropical or tropical moist montane forests.

References

Mamberamo shrikethrush
Birds of New Guinea
Mamberamo shrikethrush
Mamberamo shrikethrush